Emotionalism may refer to:

Placing focus on emotions
Appearance emotionalism, a philosophical concept that inanimate objects and phenomena may convey emotions to people by their appearances resembling emotional expressions
Emotionalism (disorder) a historical synonym for pseudobulbar affect, a neurological disorder manifested in uncontrollable displays of emotions (laughter, crying, etc.)
Emotionalism (album), an album by The Avett Brothers